Ragged Island may refer to:

Bahamas
 Ragged Island, Bahamas

Canada
 Imiliit formerly Ragged Island, Nunavut, Canada

United Kingdom
 Ragged Island, Isles of Scilly, England

United States
 Ragged Island (Pye Islands), Alaska, United States
 Ragged Island (Harpswell, Maine), United States
 Ragged Island (Massachusetts), United States
 Ragged Island Wildlife Management Area, Virginia, United States
 Criehaven, Maine, United States, also called Ragged Island

See also 
 Ragged Islands, Newfoundland and Labrador, Canada
 Rugged Island (South Shetland Islands), Antarctica
 Ragged Isle, an American soap opera web series